Peer Gynt, Op. 23, is the incidental music to Henrik Ibsen's 1867 play of the same name, written by the Norwegian composer Edvard Grieg in 1875. It premiered along with the play on 24 February 1876 in Christiania (now Oslo).

Grieg later created two suites from his Peer Gynt music. Some of the music from these suites has received coverage in popular culture; see Grieg's music in popular culture.

Background
Edvard Grieg (1843–1907) was one of the definitive leaders of Scandinavian music and his influence was great. Although composing many short piano pieces and chamber works, the work Grieg did for Henrik Ibsen stood out. Originally composing 90 minutes of orchestral music for the play, he later went back and extracted certain sections for the suites. Peer Gynt's travels around the world and distant lands are represented by the instruments Grieg chooses to use.

When Ibsen asked Grieg to write music for the play in 1874, he reluctantly agreed. However, it was much more difficult for Grieg than he imagined, as he wrote to a friend: 

Nina Grieg, his wife, wrote of Edvard and his music: 

Even though the premiere was a "triumphant success", it prompted Grieg to complain bitterly that the Swedish management of the theatre had given him specifications as to the duration of each number and its order: 

For many years, the suites were the only parts of the music that were available, as the original score was not published until 1908, one year after Grieg's death, by Johan Halvorsen.

Original score, Op. 23
Various recordings have been made of this music. Some recordings that claim to contain the complete incidental music have 33 selections; the recording conducted by Ole Kristian Ruud is split into 49 items. Both recordings include several verses from the drama, read by actors.

The original score contains 26 movements: Movements indicated in bold were extracted by Grieg into two suites.

 Act I
 Prelude: At the Wedding (I brudlaupsgarden)
 The Bridal Procession (Brudefylgjet dreg forbi)
 Halling (Halling)
 Springar (Springdans)
 Act II
 Prelude: The Abduction of the Bride. Ingrid's Lament (Bruderovet / Ingrids klage)
 Peer Gynt and the Herd-Girls (Peer Gynt og seterjentene)
 Peer Gynt and the Woman in Green (Peer Gynt og den grønkledde)
 By His mount You Shall Judge Him (På ridestellet skal storfolk kjennes)
 In the Hall of the Mountain King (I Dovregubbens hall)
 Dance of the Mountain King's Daughter (Dans av Dovregubbens datter)
 Peer Gynt hunted by the trolls (Peer Gynt jages av troll)
 Peer Gynt and the Boyg (Peer Gynt og Bøygen)
 Act III
 Prelude: Deep in the Forest (Dypt Inne I Barskogen)
 Solveig's Song (Solvejgs sang)
 The Death of Åse (Åses død)
 Act IV
 Prelude: Morning Mood (Morgenstemning)
 The Thief and the Receiver (Tjuven og heilaren)
 Arabian Dance (Arabisk dans)
 Anitra's Dance (Anitras dans)
 Peer Gynt's Serenade (Peer Gynts serenade)
 Peer Gynt and Anitra (Peer og Anitra)
 Solveig's Song (Solvejgs sang)
 Act V
 Prelude: Peer Gynt's Homecoming (Peer Gynts heimfart)
 Shipwreck (Skipsforliset)
 Day Scene
 Solveig sings in the hut (Solvejg syngjer i hytta)
 Night Scene (Nattscene)
 Whitsun Hymn (Pinsesalme)
 Solveig's Cradle Song (Solvejgs vuggevise)

The complete score of the incidental music includes several songs and choral pieces. The complete score was believed to be lost until the 1980s and has been performed in its entirety only since then. (See the article on Ibsen's play for a list of notable productions, including concert performances of the incidental music.)

It was originally orchestrated for: one piccolo, two flutes, two oboes, two clarinets in A, two bassoons, four horns in E, two trumpets in E, three trombones, a tuba, timpani, cymbals, bass drum, triangle, harp, and strings.

Suites 
Over a decade after composing the full incidental music for Peer Gynt, Grieg extracted eight movements to make two four-movement suites. The Peer Gynt suites are among his best-known works, however, they initially began as incidental compositions. Suite No. 1, Op. 46 was published in 1888, and Suite No. 2, Op. 55 was published in 1893. A typical rendition of both suites lasts 20 to 35 minutes.

Suite No. 1, Op. 46

Suite No. 2, Op. 55

Originally, the second suite had a fifth number, The Dance of the Mountain King's Daughter, but Grieg withdrew it.

See also
Grieg's music in popular culture
Norwegian romantic nationalism

References

External links

 
 "Solveig's Song" performed by Luisa Tetrazzini

 
Incidental music
1875 compositions
Stefan Zweig Collection
Compositions for symphony orchestra

it:Peer Gynt#Le musiche di scena di Grieg